The list of shipwrecks in January 1821 includes ships sunk, wrecked or otherwise lost during January 1821.

1 January

2 January

3 January

4 January

5 January

6 January

7 January

8 January

9 January

11 January

12 January

13 January

14 January

15 January

16 January

18 January

19 January

20 January

22 January

23 January

24 January

25 January

26 January

29 January

30 January

31 January

Unknown date

References

1821-01